Ali al-Haidari (died January 4, 2005) was the governor of the Baghdad Governorate in Iraq. Al-Haidari had narrowly escaped being killed in an assassination attempt in early September 2004 in Baghdad, but he was assassinated by gunmen during a second attempt in Baghdad in early 2005. A group led by Abu Musab al-Zarqawi claimed responsibility, and six suspects were arrested in November 2005.

References

Haidri, Ali Al-
Al-Haidri, Ali
Al-Haidri, Ali
Iraqi Shia Muslims
Governors of Baghdad Governorate
2005 murders in Iraq
People murdered in Iraq
Al-Haidri, Ali